Claude Pinard (born June 15, 1949) is a politician in Quebec, Canada.  He serves as Member of the National Assembly of Quebec for the riding of Saint-Maurice in the Mauricie region from 1994 to 2007 and since the 2008 provincial elections.

Background

He was born on June 15, 1949 in Shawinigan-Sud. Pinard graduated from the Séminaire Sainte-Marie of Shawinigan in 1968, studied law at Université Laval and became a notary in 1974. He served as president of the local branch of Optimist International and president of the Shawinigan Cataractes in the 1980s.

Municipal politics

He was elected Mayor of Shawinigan-Sud in 1985 and served of four-year term in that office.  He did not run for re-election in 1989.

Provincial politics

Pinard ran as the Parti Québécois candidate in the district of Saint-Maurice in the 1994, 1998 and 2003 elections.  He was elected each time.

Pinard was Deputy Speaker of the House from 1996 to 2002.

In 2005 he supported leadership candidate Richard Legendre over André Boisclair.

In 2007, the Action démocratique du Québec (ADQ) made an important breakthrough in the Mauricie area sweeping most provincial seats in that area.  ADQ candidate Robert "Bob" Deschamps won the election, keeping Pinard from winning a fourth straight term.

Nonetheless, Pinard won his seat back in the 2008 election.

Footnotes

See also
Mauricie
Saint-Maurice Legislators
Saint-Maurice Provincial Electoral District
Shawinigan, Quebec

External links
 

Living people
1949 births
Mayors of places in Quebec
Parti Québécois MNAs
Séminaire Sainte-Marie alumni
Université Laval alumni
People from Shawinigan
Vice Presidents of the National Assembly of Quebec
21st-century Canadian politicians